| player              = 
| prevseason          = Apertura 2016
| nextseason          = Apertura 2017
}}

The Clausura 2017 Copa MX (officially the Clausura 2017 Copa Corona MX for sponsorship reasons) was the 77th staging of the Copa MX, the 50th staging in the professional era and is the tenth tournament played since the 1996–97 edition.

This tournament began on 17 January 2017 and ended on 19 April 2017.

The final was held at Estadio Chivas in the Guadalajara suburb of Zapopan with the home team Guadalajara defeating Morelia 3–1 on penalty kicks to win their fourth title.

As winners, Guadalajara earned a spot to face Querétaro (winners of the Apertura 2016 edition), in the 2017 Supercopa MX.

Participants
This tournament featured clubs from Liga MX who did not participate in the 2016–17 CONCACAF Champions League knockout stages (Monterrey). Due to the Mexican clubs withdrawing from the Copa Libertadores, teams who qualified to the 2017 edition (Tijuana, América and Guadalajara) also participated in the tournament, which made nine groups instead of eight like in the previous edition.

The tournament also featured the top 12 Ascenso MX teams of the Apertura 2016 classification table.

Draw

The draw for the tournament took place on December 14, 2016 at the Mexican Football Federation headquarters in Toluca, Mexico. 27 teams were drawn into nine groups of three, with each group containing one team from each of the three pots.

Clubs in Pot 1 were drawn to be the seed of each group according to the order of their drawing. That is, the first club that was drawn is seed of Group 1, the second drawn is seed of Group 2 and so on and so on. The Liga MX teams in Pot 1 are the title holders (Querétaro), the three who qualified to the 2017 Copa Libertadores (Tijuana, Guadalajara, América) and the club not participating in the 2016–17 CONCACAF Champions League knockout stages (Monterrey). The Ascenso MX teams in Pot 1 are the four best teams in the Apertura 2016 classification table.

Pot 2 contained Liga MX clubs who ended 7–10 in the Apertura 2016 classification table and Ascenso MX clubs who ended 5–9 in the Apertura 2016 classification table.

Pot 3 contained Liga MX clubs who ended 11–16 in the Apertura 2016 classification table and Ascenso MX clubs who ended 10–12 Apertura 2016 classification table.

Teams

Tiebreakers
If two or more clubs are equal on points on completion of the group matches, the following criteria are applied to determine the rankings:

 superior goal difference;
 higher number of goals scored;
 scores of the group matches played among the clubs in question;
 higher number of goals scored away in the group matches played among the clubs in question;
 best position in the Relegation table;
 fair play ranking;
 drawing of lots.

Group stage
Every group is composed of three clubs, each group has at least one club from Liga MX and Ascenso MX

All times are UTC−06:00 except for matches in Cancún (UTC−05:00), Ciudad Juárez, Culiacán, Hermosillo, Tepic (all UTC−07:00) and Tijuana (UTC−08:00)

Group 1

Group 2

Group 3

Group 4

Group 5

Group 6

Group 7

Group 8

Group 9

Ranking of second-placed teams

Knockout stage
The clubs that advance to this stage will be ranked and seeded 1 to 16 based on performance in the group stage. In case of ties, the same tiebreakers used to rank the runners-up will be used.
All rounds are played in a single game. If a game ends in a draw, it will proceed directly to a penalty shoot-out. The highest seeded club will host each match, regardless of which division each club belongs. 
The winners of the groups and the seven best second place teams of each group will advance to the Knockout stage.

Qualified teams
The nine group winners and the seven best runners-up from the group stage qualify for the final stage.

Seeding

Bracket

Round of 16
All times are UTC−06:00 except for matches in Tijuana (UTC−08:00)

Quarterfinals

Semifinals

Final

Top goalscorers
Players sorted first by goals scored, then by last name

Source: Copa MX

References

External links
Official site

2017, 1
Copa Mx, 1
Copa Mx, 1